Aidan Meehan is an Irish artist and author of 18 books on Celtic art and design. including the eight-volume Celtic Design series and Celtic Alphabets, Celtic Borders, The Book of Kells Painting Book, The Lindisfarne Painting Book and Celtic Knots, all published by Thames & Hudson

Career
In 1974 Meehan discovered the triple grid format for creating Knotwork.

Bibliography
 Celtic Design: Knotwork: The Secret Method of the Scribes by Aidan Meehan published 1991
 Celtic Design: A Beginner's Manual by Aidan Meehan published 1991
 Celtic Design: Animal Patterns by Aidan Meehan published 1992
 Celtic Design: Illuminated Letters by Aidan Meehan published 1992
 Celtic Design: Spiral Patterns by Aidan Meehan published 1993
 Celtic Design: Maze Patterns by Aidan Meehan published 1993
 Celtic Design: The Tree of Life by Aidan Meehan published 1995
 Celtic Design: The Dragon and the Griffin: The Viking Impact by Aidan Meehan published 1995
 Celtic Patterns for Painting and Crafts by Aidan Meehan 1997
 Celtic Alphabets by Aidan Meehan published 1998
 Celtic Borders by Aidan Meehan Published 1999
 The Book of Kells Painting Book by Aidan Meehan published 1999
 The Lindisfarne Painting Book by Aidan Meehan 2000
 Celtic Knots: Mastering the Traditional Patterns by Aidan Meehan published 2003
 The Treasury of Celtic Knots by Aidan Meehan 2005
 The Celtic Design Book by Aidan Meehan published 2007

See also
Celtic knot
Labyrinth
Celtic maze
Endless knot
Book of Kells

References

External links
 Aidan Meehan on Goodreads

Year of birth missing (living people)
Living people
Celtic Revival
Irish male artists
Irish male writers